The Dennison Manufacturing Co. Paper Box Factory is a historic factory building at 175 Maple Street in Marlborough, Massachusetts.

It was built in 1923 and owned by the paper company until 1969. After Dennison left, a subsidiary of Dennison, Design Pak, was based in the building. In 2007, the building was converted into apartments. The building was added to the National Register of Historic Places in 2008.

Dennison, founded by brothers Aaron and Eliphalet W. Dennison as an adjunct to their father's jewelry business, was originally a jewelry-box making company run out of the family home in Brunswick, Maine, in the 1840s.

See also
National Register of Historic Places listings in Marlborough, Massachusetts

References

Industrial buildings and structures on the National Register of Historic Places in Massachusetts
Industrial buildings completed in 1923
Buildings and structures in Marlborough, Massachusetts
National Register of Historic Places in Middlesex County, Massachusetts